Braniștea is a commune in Bistrița-Năsăud County, Transylvania, Romania. It is composed of three villages: Braniștea, Cireșoaia (Magyardécse) and Măluț (Omlásalja).

Geography
The commune lies on the Transylvanian Plateau, on the left bank of the Someșul Mare River.

Braniștea borders Unguraș village to the south, Sânmărghita village to the west, Reteag and Uriu villages to the north, Cristeștii Ciceului and Coldău villages to the northeast, the town of Beclean to the east, and Rusul de Jos and Malin villages to the southeast.

Demographics
At the 2011 census, 62.7% of inhabitants were Hungarians and 37.1% Romanians. At the 2002 census, 60.6% were Reformed, 34.6% Romanian Orthodox, 2.4% Seventh-day Adventist and 1.1% Pentecostal.

Natives
 (1881–1951), priest, delegate at the Great National Assembly of Alba Iulia of December 1, 1918
Valer Săsărman (1969–2021), footballer

References

Communes in Bistrița-Năsăud County
Localities in Transylvania